Theodore Lorch (September 29, 1873 – November 12, 1947) was an American film actor. He appeared in more than 140 films between 1908 and 1947.

Biography
Born in Springfield, Illinois, in 1873, Lorch appeared in several Three Stooges comedies. He was the suspicious Major "Bloodhound" Filbert in Uncivil Warriors, the snooty psychologist Professor Sedlitz in Half-Wits Holiday, and General Muster in Goofs and Saddles. He also performed tiny bit roles, such as the butler in If a Body Meets a Body and Micro-Phonies.

Lorch died on November 12, 1947. His final Stooge film, The Hot Scots, was released posthumously in 1948. He was interred at Forest Lawn Memorial Park, Glendale, California.

Selected filmography

 The Last of the Mohicans (1920) - Chingachgook
 Gasoline Gus (1921) - Dry Check Charlie
 Shell Shocked Sammy (1923)
 Westbound (1924)
 The Sea Hawk (1924) - Turkish Merchant (uncredited)
 Dangerous Pleasure (1924) - Rex Darrow
 Folly of Youth (1925)
 Heir-Loons (1925)
 Manhattan Madness (1925) - Count Von Eckmann
 The Man on the Box (1925) - Mr. Lampton
 Once in a Lifetime (1925) - Tommy
 Where the Worst Begins (1925)
 You're Fired (1925) - Frank LaRue
 Sweet Adeline (1926)
 Unknown Dangers (1926)
 Across the Pacific (1926) - Aguinaldo's Agent
 The Better 'Ole (1926) - Gaspard (uncredited)
 The King of Kings (1927) - (uncredited)
 Tracked by the Police (1927) - 'Bull' Storm
 The Missing Link (1927) - Hunter (uncredited)
 Black Jack (1927) - Sam Vonner
 Sailor Izzy Murphy (1927) - First Mate
 Ginsberg the Great (1927) - Charles Wheeler
 Wild Blood (1928) - Luke Conner
 The Canyon of Adventure (1928) - Don Alfredo Villegas
 The Royal Rider (1929) - Prime Minister
 Show Boat (1929) - Frank (uncredited)
 Spite Marriage (1929) - Actor as 'Union Officer' (uncredited)
 Free and Easy (1930) - Himself - Dynamite Scene Director (uncredited)
 The Runaway Bride (1930) - Dr. C. Kent (uncredited)
 Whoopee! (1930) - Indian (uncredited)
 A Lady's Morals (1930) - Audience Member Socked by Paul (uncredited)
 Son of India (1931) - Tour Guide (uncredited)
 The Montana Kid (1931) - Larson's Bartender (uncredited)
 The Galloping Ghost (1931, Serial) - The Crippled Stranger
 Grief Street (1931) - 'Pop', Newspaper City Editor (uncredited)
 The Sin of Madelon Claudet (1931) - Felix - the Headwaiter (uncredited)
 The Lightning Warrior (1931, Serial) - Pierre La Farge
 Single-Handed Sanders (1932) - Sheriff Murray (uncredited)
 Arsène Lupin (1932) - Lupin's Butler (uncredited)
 The Tenderfoot (1932) - An Actor (uncredited)
 Honor of the Mounted (1932) - Henchman
 The Texas Bad Man (1932) - Jim - Henchman (uncredited)
 Broadway to Cheyenne (1932) - New York Doctor (uncredited)
 The King Murder (1932) - Dr. Stern, Coroner (uncredited)
 Cowboy Counsellor (1932) - State's Attorney - Replaced Gordon DeMain (uncredited)
 The Man from Arizona (1932) - Bartender
 Man of Action (1933) - Bartender (uncredited)
 Gabriel Over the White House (1933) - Delegate to the Debt Conference (uncredited)
 Black Beauty (1933) - Bledsoe, the Veterinary
 The Whirlwind (1933) - Red - Bartender (uncredited)
 The Girl in 419 (1933) - Examination Doctor (uncredited)
 The Return of Casey Jones (1933) - Dr. Wallace (uncredited)
 The Gallant Fool (1933) - Rainey
 The Sphinx (1933) - Dr. Augustus Kelton (uncredited)
 Gambling Ship (1933) - Gambler (uncredited)
 The Fugitive (1933) - Parker
 The Road to Ruin (1934) - Abortion Doctor (uncredited)
 A Modern Hero (1934) - Ringmaster (uncredited)
 Blue Steel (1934) - Townsman (uncredited)
 Monte Carlo Nights (1934) - Gambler (uncredited)
 Friends of Mr. Sweeney (1934) - Gambler (uncredited)
 The Count of Monte Cristo (1934) - Citizen (uncredited)
 The Tonto Kid (1934) - Sam Creech - Lawyer
 The Affairs of Cellini (1934) - Executioner (uncredited)
 Two Heads on a Pillow (1934) - Member of the Jury (uncredited)
 We Live Again (1934) - Guard in Courtyard (uncredited)
 Jealousy (1934) - Minor Role (uncredited)
 Gunfire (1934) - Ross McGregor
 The Mysterious Mr. Wong (1934) - Wong Henchman Thrown Into Pit (uncredited)
 The Mighty Barnum (1934) - Bartender (uncredited)
 The Drunkard (1935) - Lawyer Squire Gribbs
 Reckless (1935) - Member of Coroner's Jury (uncredited)
 The Desert Trail (1935) - Robbed Stage Passenger (uncredited)
 Uncivil Warriors (1935, Short) - Maj. 'Bloodhound' Filbert (uncredited)
 Hold 'Em Yale (1935) - Pullman Conductor (uncredited)
 Rustler's Paradise (1935) - Rance Kimball, alias El Diablo
 Vagabond Lady (1935) - Dock Official (uncredited)
 Mad Love (1935) - Actor at Party (uncredited)
 Call of the Wild (1935) - Dawson Townsman (uncredited)
 His Fighting Blood (1935) - A. Leslie, the Jeweler
 Barbary Coast (1935) - Helmsman (uncredited)
 The Last Days of Pompeii (1935) - Slaver (uncredited)
 The New Frontier (1935) - Joe
 Annie Oakley (1935) - Wild West Show Announcer (uncredited)
 The Shadow of Silk Lennox (1935) - Kennedy - Ward-Heeler
 Black Gold (1936) - Wooden Derrick Bartender (uncredited)
 Flash Gordon (1936, Serial) - High Priest #2 [Chs. 8-11, 13]
 The Fugitive Sheriff (1936) - Rally Speaker (uncredited)
 Romance Rides the Range (1936) - Jonas Allen
 The President's Mystery (1936) - Townsman (uncredited)
 Aces Wild (1936) - Kelton
 Rebellion (1936) - General Vallejo
 Rip Roarin' Buckaroo (1936) - Trainer Todd Knapp (uncredited)
 Two Minutes to Play (1936) - Tim - Bartender
 Come and Get It (1936) - Lumberjack (uncredited)
 Cheyenne Rides Again (1937) - Rollins
 Blake of Scotland Yard (1937) - Daggett - the Butler
 Dick Tracy (1937, Serial) - Patorno [Chs. 1, 12]
 Marked Woman (1937) - 2nd Juror #2 (uncredited)
 The Cherokee Strip (1937) - Jury Member (uncredited)
 Orphan of the Pecos (1937) - Prof. Jeremiah Mathews
 Goofs and Saddles (1937, Short) - Gen. Muster (uncredited)
 Lost Ranch (1937) - Henchman Merkle
 The Toast of New York (1937) - Man at Opera (uncredited)
 Confession (1937) - Man in Court (uncredited)
 Idol of the Crowds (1937) - Man with Irwin at Bar (uncredited)
 Madame X (1937) - Pawnbroker (uncredited)
 Alcatraz Island (1937) - First Trial Fixed Juror (uncredited)
 Maid's Night Out (1938) - Headwaiter (uncredited)
 Kentucky Moonshine (1938) - First Buckboard Driver (uncredited)
 The Fighting Devil Dogs (1938, Serial) - 'Wing' Henchman (uncredited)
 Professor Beware (1938) - Railroad Worker (uncredited)
 I Am the Law (1938) - Clerk (uncredited)
 Red River Range (1938) - Rancher (uncredited)
 Stand Up and Fight (1939) - Henchman (uncredited)
 Stagecoach (1939) - Lordsburg Express Agent (uncredited)
 We Want Our Mummy (1939, Short) - Thug in Mummy Outfit (uncredited)
 Buck Rogers (1939, Serial) - Kane's Council Member (uncredited)
 Zorro's Fighting Legion (1939, Serial) - Councilman Carlos (uncredited)
 The Hunchback of Notre Dame (1939) - Minor Role (uncredited)
 The Lady in Question (1940) - Juror (uncredited)
 Bad Man of Deadwood (1941) - Businessman (uncredited)
 Nine Lives Are Not Enough (1941) - City Room Worker (uncredited)
 Jesse James at Bay (1941) - Townsman (uncredited)
 The Remarkable Andrew (1942) - Jurist (uncredited)
 Butch Minds the Baby (1942) - Susie's Neighbour (uncredited)
 The Pride of the Yankees (1942) - Neighbor Leaning Through Window (uncredited)
 The Glass Key (1942) - Dinner Guest (uncredited)
 Bowery at Midnight (1942) - Tramp Playing Checkers at Friendly Mission (uncredited)
 Hello, Frisco, Hello (1943) - Barfly at Sharkey's (uncredited)
 Spook Louder (1943, Short) - Mr. Graves (uncredited)
 This Land Is Mine (1943) - Juror (uncredited)
 If a Body Meets a Body (1945, Short) - Jerkington, the Butler
 The Hoodlum Saint (1946) - Minor Role (uncredited)
 Badman's Territory (1946) - Citizen's Committee Member (uncredited)
 Deception (1946) - Well-wisher at Concert (uncredited)
 Half-Wits Holiday (1947, Short) - Prof. Sedletz
 My Brother Talks to Horses (1947) - Spectator at Racetrack (uncredited)
 Body and Soul (1947) - Man at Weigh-in (uncredited)
 Here Comes Trouble (1948) - Extra (uncredited)
 The Hot Scots (1948, Short) - MacPherson, the Butler (final film role)
 Scotched in Scotland (1954, Short) - McPherson (archive footage)

References

External links

1873 births
1947 deaths
American male film actors
American male silent film actors
20th-century American male actors
Male actors from Illinois
People from Springfield, Illinois